Clay Cross was a county constituency centred on the village of Clay Cross in north-east Derbyshire. It returned one Member of Parliament to the House of Commons of the Parliament of the United Kingdom, elected by the first past the post system.

The constituency was created for the 1918 general election, and abolished for the 1950 general election.

Boundaries 
The Urban District of Clay Cross, the Rural District of Blackwell, and part of the Rural District of Chesterfield.

Members of Parliament

Election results

Elections in the 1910s

Elections in the 1920s

Elections in the 1930s

Elections in the 1940s

References

Bibliography

Parliamentary constituencies in Derbyshire (historic)
Constituencies of the Parliament of the United Kingdom established in 1918
Constituencies of the Parliament of the United Kingdom disestablished in 1950